Brahima Cissé (born 10 February 1976) is a Burkinabé football player who, as of 2006, was playing for Union Sportive des Forces Armées.

He was part of the Burkinabé 2000 and 2002 African Nations Cup teams, who finished bottom of their groups in the first round of competition, thus failing to secure qualification for the quarter-finals.

External links
 

1976 births
Burkinabé footballers
Burkinabé Muslims
Living people
US des Forces Armées players
2000 African Cup of Nations players
2002 African Cup of Nations players
Association football defenders
Burkina Faso international footballers
21st-century Burkinabé people